Mikheil Gelovani (Russified as Михаи́л Гео́ргиевич Гелова́ни, Mikhail Georgievich Gelovani;  – 21 December 1956) was a Soviet and Georgian actor, known for his numerous portrayals of Joseph Stalin in cinema, starring in fifteen historic movies mostly about the early Soviet era. He was recognized as People's Artist of the USSR in 1950.

Biography

Early life
Mikheil Gelovani was a descendant of the old Georgian princely house of Gelovani. He made his stage debut in a theater in Batumi during 1913. From 1919 to 1920, he attended the Drama Studio in Tiflis. In the two following years, he was a member of the cast in the city's Rustaveli Theatre. From 1923, he worked as an actor and a director in Georgian SSR's Goskinprom film studio. In 1924, he first appeared on screen in the film Three Lives. He moved to the Armenian SSR's Armenkino production unit in 1927. In addition to his cinematic work, Gelovani continued to appear in theater, and performed on stages in Kutaisi and Baku. In 1936 he returned to the ensemble of the Rustaveli Theatre, and remained there for three years.

Antebellum
In 1938, Gelovani first portrayed Stalin in Mikheil Chiaureli's The Great Dawn. His performance won him the Order of the Red Banner of Labour on 1 February 1939 and the Stalin Prize during 1941. Afterwards, Gelovani "established a monopoly on the role of Stalin", which he continued to portray in twelve other pictures until the premier's death. Gelovani greatly resembled Stalin physically, except in his stature: he was much taller than the latter. Reportedly, he was not the premier's favorite candidate for depicting himself on screen: since he was Georgian, he mimicked Stalin's accent "to perfection". Therefore, the leader personally preferred Aleksei Dikiy, who used classic Russian pronunciation. However, Gelovani appeared in his role much more than Dikiy. According to The Guinness Book of Movie Facts and Feats, Gelovani had probably portrayed the same historical figure more than any other actor. When the two met, the general secretary told the actor: "you are observing me thoroughly... You do not waste time, do you?"

Soviet cinema played an important part in cultivating Stalin's cult of personality: from 1937 onward, in a gradual process, Stalin's reign was legitimized by depicting him as Vladimir Lenin's most devout follower and by positively presenting historical autocrats - like in Sergei Eisenstein's Ivan the Terrible.

Later years
Due to his identification with Stalin, Gelovani was barred from playing other roles in cinema; he was not allowed to depict "mere mortals". From 1942 to 1948, he was a member of the cast in the Gorky Moscow Art Theatre. During World War II, the personality cult was abandoned in favor of patriotic motifs, but returned already at the war's late stages, and with greater intensity than ever after 1945: Stalin was soon credited as the sole architect of victory. In the postwar films in which he portrayed him – The Vow, The Fall of Berlin and The Unforgettable Year 1919 – Gelovani presented the leader as "a living god".

The actor was awarded three more Stalin Prizes, all of which were granted for his performances of the premier in film: in 1942 for The Defence of Tsaritsyn, in 1947 for The Vow and in 1950 for The Fall of Berlin. On 3 June 1950, he was given the title People's Artist of the USSR.

After Stalin's death in 1953, Gelovani was denied new roles in films, since he was completely identified with the character of the dead ruler. From 1953 until his death in 1956, he acted in Moscow's State Theater for Film Actors. Andreas Kilb wrote that he ended his life "a pitiful Kagemusha" of Stalin. 

Gelovani died on 21 December 1956 of Myocardial infarction in Moscow, and was buried in the Novodevichy Cemetery, alongside his wife Ludmila.

Following Nikita Khrushchev's Secret Speech in 1956, most of the pictures he appeared in as Stalin were either banned or had the relevant scenes removed.

Filmography
As actor

As director

References

Bibliography
 S. V. Dumin, P. Kh Grebelskii, V. V. Lapin. Dvorianskie Rody Rossiiskoi Imperii: Kniazʹia Tsarstva Gruzinskogo. IPK Vesti (1994). .
Aleksandr Prokhorov (chief editor). Great Soviet Encyclopedia (Volume 6). Collier Macmillan Publishers (1982). .
Valeri Torchinov, Alexei Leontiuk. Vokrug Stalina: Istoriko-Biograficheskii Spravochnik. Filologicheskii Fakultet Sankt-Peterburgskogo Universitet (2000). .
Helen Rappaport. Joseph Stalin: A Biographical Companion. ABC-CLIO (1999). .
Birgit Beumers. A History of Russian Cinema. Berg Publishers (2009). .
Sergei Yutkevich, Yuri Afanaseev. Kino: Entsiklopedicheskii Slovar. Soviet Encyclopedia (1987). .
Klaus Heller, Jan Plamper. Personality Cults in Stalinism. Vandenhoeck & Ruprecht (2004). 
Evgeni Dobrenko. Stalinist Cinema and the Production of History: Museum of the Revolution. Edinburgh University Press (2003). .
Denise J. Youngblood. Russian War Films: On the Cinema Front, 1914-2005. University Press of Kansas (2007). .
Richard Taylor. Film propaganda: Soviet Russia and Nazi Germany. I.B. Tauris (1999). .
Simon Sebag Montefiore. Stalin - The Court of the Red Tsar. Phoenix London (2004). .
Philip Boobbyer. The Stalin Era. Springer Verlag (2000). .
Richard Taylor, D. W. Spring. Stalinism and Soviet Cinema. Routledg (1993). .
Patrick Robertsons. The Guinness Book of Movie Facts & Feats. Abbeville Press (1991). .
Konstantin Zaleski. Imperiia Stalina: Biograficheskii entsiklopedicheskii slovar. Veche (2000). .

External links

Mikheil Gelovani. kino-teatr.ru.
Mikheil Gelovani. russiancinema.ru
Mikheil Gelovani. kinosozvezdie.ru.

1893 births
1956 deaths
20th-century actors from Georgia (country)
People from Racha-Lechkhumi and Kvemo Svaneti
People from Kutais Governorate
Svan people
People's Artists of Georgia
People's Artists of the USSR
Stalin Prize winners
Recipients of the Order of the Red Banner of Labour
Nobility of Georgia (country)
Male film actors from Georgia (country)
Male stage actors from Georgia (country)
Male silent film actors from Georgia (country)
Soviet male silent film actors
Soviet male stage actors
Soviet male film actors
Burials at Novodevichy Cemetery